Robert Hull is an American television writer and producer.

He is currently the Executive Producer of the NBC show Quantum Leap after being the Co-Showrunner and Executive Producer of the CBS show "God Friended Me." A veteran writer-producer, he is well known for his work on The CW Television Network drama/Mystery "Veronica Mars" and "Gossip Girl" as well as the Fox Television Network/Bad Robot drama "Alcatraz" produced by J.J. Abrams, the ABC fantasy/mystery series Once Upon a Time, and Warner Brothers/D.C."Gotham."

Career
He got his start producing the crime film Nether World, starring W. Morgan Sheppard and Mark Sheppard that premiered in competition at the Stockholm International Film Festival, before writing and producing the award winning documentary "The Other Hollywood" that was distributed by IFC.  In 2006 he turned his attention to television when he was hired as a writer by Rob Thomas to join his critically acclaimed drama series Veronica Mars.  After completion of Veronica Mars Hull joined the ABC series Big Shots starring Michael Vartan and Dylan McDermott.

In 2008, Hull boarded The CW drama Gossip Girl, as a story editor, for its second season. During the second half of season two, Hull was promoted to executive story editor. With the commencement of the fourth season Hull began serving as co-producer. When the fourth season concluded he left the show. He wrote and produced multiple episodes while working on the series.

During summer 2011, Hull joined the Fox drama Alcatraz as a producer and writer, for its freshman and only season where he wrote multiple episodes. After the show's cancelation, he joined the breakout hit ABC fantasy series Once Upon a Time, for its second season. rising to Supervising Producer with the commencement of its third season. After taking a year off to focus on development, he returned to Warner Brothers and FOX as a Co-EP on the D.C. comics hit "Gotham". He is currently developing multiple film and tv projects including the tv series "Acquired" at ABC.

References

External links
 

American television producers
American television writers
American male television writers
Living people
Place of birth missing (living people)
Year of birth missing (living people)